Strongin is a surname. Notable people with the surname include:

Laurie Strongin, American author and medical research campaigner
Martha Strongin Katz, violist and member of the faculty of the New England Conservatory of Music
Theodore Strongin (1918–1998), American music critic, composer, flautist, and entomologist